Pett Bottom is a small settlement about five miles (8 km) south of Canterbury, Kent, England. The nearest village is Lower Hardres. It is in the civil parishes of Bishopsbourne and Lower Hardres and Nackington, both of which are in the City of Canterbury.

In the novels by Ian Fleming, James Bond lived here with his aunt after being orphaned.

References

Villages in Kent
City of Canterbury